Pariṇāmavāda, known in English as Transformation theory, is a Hindu philosophical theory which pre-supposes the cause to be continually transforming itself into its effects, and it has three variations – the Satkarya-vada of the Samkhyas, the Prakrti Parinama-vada of the Saiva Siddhanta and the Brahma-Parinama-vada of the Vishishtadvaita Vedanta School of Thought.

Overview

In Indian philosophy, there are basically three major cosmological theories of origination – 1) Arambha-vada (the theory of atomic agglomeration, based on the theory of Asatkarya-vada that the effect, which is something newly produced, does not exist in the cause), 2) Parinama-vada (the theory of real transformation, based on satkarya-vada that the effect, though phenomenally different, is substantially identical with the cause, and pre-exists latently in it), and 3) Vivartavada (the theory of apparent transformation or of false appearance). There is also the fourth, Pratityasamutpada-vada, the theory of dependent origination of Buddhism.

According to the Sat-Karya-vada of the Samkhya School, also accepted by the Vishishtadvaitavada Vedanta, causation is the manifestation of what is in the latent condition in the cause. The Prakrti Parinama-vada is based on the premise that the world is a transformation of the primordial Nature or Prakrti. According to the Brahman Parinama-vada, the world is a transformation of Brahman.
Parināma-vāda is the term that refers to the non-advaitin theory of actual transformation. This is different from vivartavada, the advaita theory of apparent transformation. It is the theory that the effect is a real transformation of the cause. According to the Brahman-parinama, this universe is a real transformation of Brahman.

Arambha-vada

The Arambha-vada theory of causation is advocated by the Nyaya School, which is the creationistic view of causation and implies new creation as the effect that puts an end to its antecedent nonexistence and marks a new beginning. According to this school the effect, being the counter-entity of its prior nonexistence, must be held to be nonexistent before its appearance as an effect although it arose out of a previously existent cause. This theory is the reverse of Parinama-vada.

Brahman as the cause

The general Vedanta view is that Brahman is both, the Material and the Efficient, cause of the entire universe. There is nothing outside the Omnipresent Brahman. Brahman is the only being which contains the elements of cit and a-cit which are transformed into the forms of individual souls and material objects. There is no external world of souls and matter produced out of external material causes, and the very concept of Pradhana or Primal Matter, outside Brahman, involves contradiction.

Sat-Karya-vada

According to this philosophy, which follows from Sat-Karya-vada, the cause first, potentially contains the effect in it as its Shakti (power), in an un-manifest way; then through the instrumentality of the efficient cause, that potential, latent, un-manifest effect is made actual, patent and manifest. Creation is not a new beginning but the manifestation of the already present un-manifest. The world, as the effect arisen from the pure cause, cannot be impure and imperfect because Brahman, the pure essence, merely transforms itself and does not change, and therefore, remains the same always, whereas the effects are mere names, due to words, for knowing and identifying the effects.

Prakrti is orderly. The Ṛta (order) that makes Prakrti appear to be composed of sub-systems arranged hierarchically with each sub-system being progressively inclusive, co-ordinating and interdependent is traditionally held to be the main basis of the doctrine of pre-existent effect or Sat-Karya-vada or the doctrine of real transformation or Parinama-vada, which R.A.Sinari states is “the earliest and epistemologically the most valuable attempt made in Indian philosophy to set up a theory of causal order”. All phenomena, belonging to the surface and/or the deeper structure of Prakrti, are parinama i.e. transformation, of one and the same substratum.

The Svetasvatara Upanishad says: मायां तु प्रकृतिं – “Know Maya to be Prakrti”. But, both the Samkhya School and the Brahma Sutras base their understandings of the process of transformation for origination of things on the will of the creator. Badarayana by stating – नासतोऽदृष्टत्वात् | (Brahma Sutra 2.2.26), declares that Existence does not come out of non-existence. The entire creation is the result of Brahman’s will – अभिध्योपदेशाच्च | (Brahma Sutra 1.4.24), and that all transmigratory existence has no beginning - उपपद्यते चाप्युलभ्यते च | (Brahma Sutra 2.1.36).

Tantra view

Tantra has influenced the Hindu, the Buddhist and the Jain traditions. According to the Srividya and the Saivite texts, the thirty-six tattvas covering the entire range of the un-manifest and manifest world, from the gross to the most subtle known as siva, pure illumination. Parinama-vada called Sakti parinama-vada, along with the doctrine of Abhasavada or Pratibimbavada, explains the relationship between samvit or Tripura and the world; Tripura refers to the totality of the three-folds – sthula (gross), suksma (subtle) and para (transcendent), it represents. According to Abhasa-vada, samvit is like a mirror and the universe is a reflection appearing on it. But the universe cannot be outside the mirror i.e. citi or samvit. According to Parinama-vada, citi (consciousness) manifests in the form of the universe without losing its pristine nature.

Vivartavada

Gaudapada treats creation as an imaginary event even though it seems to follow a sequential order. Badarayana also states that creation for Brahman is a mere pastime out of his spontaneity without any extraneous motive. But, Gaudapada, who was aware of the concepts of the real and apparent transformations, develops the doctrine of creation as an illusory transformation of Brahman without recourse to ‘vivarta’ terminology. The followers of Advaita School promoted by Adi Sankara, to whom owing to Maya the world appears as if it is real i.e. distortion or false apprehension of the all encompassing unity of Brahman, use this term ‘vivarta’ to support the principle of the immutability of reality. Vidyaranya reminds us – एकमेवाद्वितीयं सन्नामरूपविवर्जितम् | - that before the creation there existed the Reality, one only, without a second, and without name and form (Panchadasi 5.5), this after explaining (in verse 2.59) that with Brahman as its basis, Maya creates the various objects of the world, just as a variety of pictures are drawn on a wall by the use of different colours, in other words, “Maya makes it possible for the imagination to attribute different changes to the unchangeable”. it is, therefore, said that “Maya resembles avidya, the source of common illusions, and described as the principle of cosmic illusion, thus differing from Prakrti of the Samkhyas which is real in the full sense of the term”.

Criticism
Both, Parinama-vada and Vivartavada, have their own critics. Madhava rejects Bhaskara on the ground that it is not possible for Brahman to transform at the loss of original nature, and there cannot exist unbridgeable gulf between Cit (Spirit) and Jada (Matter).239 A perfect being of pure intelligence and bliss cannot evolve out of itself an effect that is inert and wholly lacking in intelligence. Ramanuja accepts the material causality of Brahman which is absolutely without personal modification and which has the transforming Prakrti as its body. Vivarta concept is rejected because Brahman is not the constituent cause of Maya, therefore Brahman cannot be the constituent cause of the world through Maya.

References

Hindu philosophical concepts
Vedanta
Language and mysticism
Hinduism and science
Creation myths